

Steam locomotive classes 

Below is a table of information for the Great Northern Railway’s steam roster with a symbol, Whyte notation, common name and notes. Included is a breakdown of the Great Northern classes, along with the date of their first construction (when known), builder, and road numbers.

0-6-0

0-8-0

2-6-0

2-6-2

2-8-0

2-8-2

2-10-2

4-4-0

4-4-2

4-6-0

4-6-2

4-8-0

4-8-2

4-8-4

Mallet and Simple Articulated Locomotives

The 4-6-6-4 locomotives (Nos. 903 and 904) were purchased from the Spokane, Portland and Seattle Railway and sold back between 1946 and 1950.

Diesel Locomotives

American Locomotive Company

Baldwin Locomotive Works

Electro-Motive Division

General Electric

Electric locomotive Classes

References

 
Great Northern